Elections to Sefton Metropolitan Borough Council, England were held on 7 May 1998. One third of the council was up for election and the council stayed under no overall control.

After the election, the composition of the council was
Labour 31
Liberal Democrat 23
Conservative 14
Independent 1

Election result

References

1998 English local elections
1998
1990s in Merseyside